"Wheel in the Sky" is a song by the American rock band Journey, recorded in 1977 and included on their fourth studio album, Infinity. It was written and composed by Robert Fleischman, Neal Schon, and Diane Valory.

Background 
At the time of the song's composition, the band had decided to follow a new direction into an edgier sound and began recording simple hard rock pieces with new lead vocalist Fleischman. He was replaced by Steve Perry once work on Infinity began in earnest. The song had started out as a poem titled "Wheels In My Mind", which had been written by Diane Valory, the wife of Journey bassist Ross Valory.

Reception 
Cash Box said it has "tight lick guitar work and effective lead and backing vocals."

"Wheel in the Sky" reached #57 on the Billboard Hot 100 in 1978, becoming Journey's first song to chart on the Hot 100, and also reached #45 on the Canadian RPM 100.

Structure 
The song opens with an instrumental that lasts for 28 seconds. Perry then sings the first verse, which is followed by the chorus, and the second verse with the chorus repeated once again. Neal Schon joins with a guitar solo which is filled with Perry's vocals. The chorus is repeated four times before the outro that closes the song.

Lyrics content 
The narrator of "Wheel in the Sky" describes the newly arrived winter, as he is lamenting not having been home "in a year or more." He is missing home and longing to return and reconnect with an unnamed woman, and he hopes that "she holds on a little bit longer." He sings forlornly of "running down [a] dusty road" and admits, "I can't take this very much longer." 

Throughout the refrain narrator notes the "wheel in the sky" which "keeps on turning," and hence can be interpreted as Diane Valory's metaphor for the various twists and turns of the narrator's life on the road as he repeatedly emphasizes, "I don't know where I'll be tomorrow." Alternatively, the wheel in the sky has often denoted the sun, which "keeps turning" in its apparent revolutions around the earth, and with each successive turn marks the passage of another day, bringing one closer to an anticipated date or event, and in this case the narrator's reunion with the woman.

Personnel
Steve Perry – lead vocals
Neal Schon – guitars, backing vocals
Gregg Rolie – piano, backing vocals
Ross Valory – bass guitar, backing vocals
Aynsley Dunbar – drums

Chart performance

References

1977 songs
1978 singles
Columbia Records singles
Journey (band) songs
Songs written by Neal Schon